Civic Commitment (Impegno Civico, IC) was a short-lived social-democratic and democratic socialist political party active in Aosta Valley, Italy.

The party was formed in the run-up of the 2018 regional election by two outgoing regional councillors, Alberto Bertin (a former member of Autonomy Liberty Participation Ecology) and Andrea Padovani (representative of "The Other Aosta Valley", connected to The Other Europe).

In the election the party obtained 7.5% of the vote and three regional councillors, Bertin, Chiara Minelli and Daria Pulz).

In January 2019 IC broke up: Bertin and Minelli launched Civic Network, while Pulz Environment Rights Equality.

References

2018 establishments in Italy
2019 disestablishments in Italy
Defunct social democratic parties in Italy
Political parties disestablished in 2019
Political parties established in 2018
Political parties in Aosta Valley